Andrew John Scott is a British economist, currently Professor of Economics at London Business School, known for his work on longevity and macroeconomics. Previously he was a lecturer at Oxford University, a visiting professor at Harvard University and a researcher at the London School of Economics.

Biography 
Scott was born 12 May 1965 in Enfield, London. He was educated at Firs Farm Primary School and Haberdashers' Aske’s, Elstree. He attended Trinity College, Oxford where he graduated with a first with prizes in Politics, Philosophy and Economics in 1987.  He received a MSc in Economics from the London School of Economics in 1990 and was elected to a Prize Fellowship to All Souls College, Oxford in 1990. He was elected in the same year as philosopher Robert Rowland Smith and historian Scott Mandelbrote. He received his D.Phil (Essays in Aggregate Consumption) from Oxford in 1994.

He worked briefly as an economist for Credit Suisse First Boston before holding research positions at London Business School and the London School of Economics.  He then took up a lectureship at Oxford University, a Visiting Assistant Professor at Harvard before joining London Business School where he is currently Professor of Economics having previously served as Deputy Dean.

Alongside his academic career Scott has been a non-executive director for the UK’s Financial Services Authority and an advisor to the House of Commons, the Bank of England, and H.M.Treasury.  He is currently on the advisory board of the UK’s Office for Budget Responsibility and a member of the Cabinet Office Honours Committee (Science and Technology).

Selected awards and recognition
 2018 Beckhard Prize Best Paper, MIT Sloan Management Review for Corporate Implications of Longer Lives
 2017 Knowsquare Business Book of the Year Award, The 100 Year Life
2016 Shortlisted FT/McKinsey Business Book of the Year – The 100 Year Life
 2008–11, Scientific Chair, Euro Area Business Cycle Network
 2004–2011 Managing Editor, The Economic Journal
 1994–95, Best Paper Award, Royal Economic Society, Consumer confidence and Rational Expectations with Daron Acemoglu, Economic Journal 1994 Jan Vol 104:422 p 1-19
 1990–97, Prize Fellowship, All Souls, Oxford

Selected publications 
 The Economic Value of Targeting Aging (with David Sinclair, Martin Ellison), Nature Aging 2021
 The Longevity Society and The Longevity Economy, The Lancet Healthy Longevity 2021
 Government Debt Management: The Long AND the short of it (with Elisa Faraglia, Albert Marcet, Rigas Oikonomou), Review of Economic Studies 2019
 Gratton, Lynda & Scott, Andrew (2016) The 100-year life: living and working in an age of longevity, Bloomsbury 2016. 
 Debt and Deficit Fluctuations and the Structure of Bond Markets (with Albert Marcet) Journal of Economic Theory, 2009
 Consumer Confidence and Rational Expectations: Are Agents' Beliefs Consistent with the Theory? (with Daron Acemoglu) Economic Journal, January 1994, 104, 1-19

References

External links
 Andrew Scott at London Business School
 100 Year Life
 The Longevity Forum
 
 
 

People educated at Haberdashers' Boys' School
British economists

English economists
Academics of London Business School
British business theorists
1965 births
Living people